Grand Prince Hyoryeong (Hangul: 효령대군, Hanja: 孝寧大君; 6 January 1396 – 12 June 1486), personal name Yi Bo (Hangul: 이보, Hanja: 李補), was the second son and fifth child of King Taejong of Joseon and his wife, Queen Wongyeong. He was the elder brother of Sejong the Great.

Family
Father
Yi Bang-won, King Taejong of Joseon (태종) (13 June 1367 - 30 May 1422)
 Grandfather – Yi Seong-gye, King Taejo of Joseon (조선 태조) (27 October 1335 – 18 June 1408)
 Grandmother – Queen Shinui of the Cheongju Han clan (신의왕후 한씨) (1337 - 21 October 1391)
Mother
Queen Wongyeong of the Yeoheung Min clan (원경왕후 민씨) (11 July 1365 – 10 July 1420)
 Grandfather – Min Je, Internal Prince Yeoheung (민제 여흥부원군, 閔霽 文度公驪興) (1339 - 1408)
 Grandmother – Princess Consort Samhanguk of the Yeosan Song clan (삼한국 대부인 여산 송씨, 三韓國 大夫人 礪山 宋氏) (1342 - 1424); Min Je’s first wife
 Siblings
 Older sister – Princess Jeongsun (정순공주, 貞順公主) (1385 - 1460)
 Brother-in-law – Yi Baek-kang (이백강, 李伯剛) (1381 - 1451)
 Niece – Lady Yi of the Cheongju Yi clan (정경부인 청주 이씨, 貞敬夫人 淸州 李氏)
 Nephew-in-law – Yi Gye-rin (이계린, 李季疄) (1401 - 1455)
 Grandniece – Lady Yi of the Hansan Yi clan (한산 이씨) (1420 - ?)
 Older sister – Princess Gyeongseong (경정공주, 慶貞公主) (1387 - 1455)
 Brother-in-law – Jo Dae-rim (조대림, 趙大臨) (1387 - 1430)
 Niece – Lady Jo of the Pyeongyang Jo clan (평양 조씨, 平壤 趙氏)
 Niece – Lady Jo of the Pyeongyang Jo clan (평양 조씨, 平壤 趙氏)
 Niece – Lady Jo of the Pyeongyang Jo clan (평양 조씨, 平壤 趙氏)
 Niece – Lady Jo of the Pyeongyang Jo clan (평양 조씨, 平壤 趙氏)
 Nephew – Jo Mu-yeong (조무영, 趙武英)
 Older sister – Princess Gyeongan (경안공주, 慶安公主) (1393 - 22 April 1415)
 Brother-in-law – Gwon Gyu (권규, 權跬) (1393 - 1421)
 Nephew – Gwon Dam (권담, 權聃) (? - 1439)
 Nephew – Gwon Chong (권총, 權聰) (1413 - 1480)
 Niece – Lady Gwon of the Andong Gwon clan (안동 권씨, 安東 權氏)
 Older brother – Yi Je, Grand Prince Yangnyeong (이제 양녕대군, 李禔 讓寧大君) (1394 - 1462)
 Sister-in-law – Grand Princess Consort Suseong of the Gwangsan Kim clan (수성부부인 광산 김씨, 隨城府夫人 光山 金氏)
 Niece – Princess Jaeryeong (재령군주) or Princess Jeonui (전의현주) (1409 - 1444)
 Nephew – Yi Gae, Prince Soonseong (이개 순성군) (? - 2 September 1462)
 Niece – Princess Yangcheon (영천군주) (1412 - 5 April 1442)
 Nephew – Yi Po, Prince Hamyang (이포 함양군) (1417 - 21 June 1475)
 Nephew – Yi Hye, Prince Seosan (이혜 서산군) (? - 10 April 1451)
 Niece – Lady Yi of the Jeonju Yi clan (이씨)
 Niece – Princess Yeongpyeong (영평현주)
 Niece – Lady Yi of the Jeonju Yi clan (이씨)
 Younger brother – Yi Do, King Sejong the Great (세종대왕, 世宗大王) (1397 - 1450)
 Sister-in-law – Queen Soheon of the Cheongseong Shim clan (소헌왕후 심씨) (12 October 1395 - 19 April 1446)
 Niece – Princess Jeongso (1412 - 1424) (정소공주)
 Nephew – Yi Hyang, King Munjong of Joseon (15 November 1414 - 1 June 1452) (왕세자 향)
 Niece – Princess Jeongui (1415 - 11 February 1477) (정의공주)
 Nephew – Yi Yu, King Sejo of Joseon (2 November 1417 - 23 September 1468) (이유 수양대군)
 Nephew – Yi Yong, Grand Prince Anpyeong (18 October 1418 - 18 November 1453) (이용 안평대군)
 Nephew – Yi Gu, Grand Prince Imyeong (6 January 1420 ‐ 21 January 1469) (이구 임영대군)
 Nephew – Yi Yeo, Grand Prince Gwangpyeong (2 May 1425 - 7 December 1444) (이여 광평대군)
 Nephew – Yi Yu, Grand Prince Geumseong (5 May 1426 - 7 November 1457) (이유 금성대군)
 Nephew – Yi Im, Grand Prince Pyeongwon (18 November 1427 ‐ 16 January 1445) (이임 평원대군)
 Nephew – Yi Yeom, Grand Prince Yeongeung (23 May 1434 - 2 February 1467) (이염 영응대군)
 Younger sister – Princess Jeongseon (정선공주, 貞善公主) (1404 - 1424)
 Brother-in-law – Nam Hui (남휘, 南暉) (? - 1454)
 Nephew – Nam Bin (남빈, 南份)
 Niece – Lady Nam of the Uiryeong Nam clan (의령 남씨, 宜寧 南氏)
 Younger brother – Yi Jong, Grand Prince Seongnyeong (이종 성녕 대군, 李褈 誠寧 大君) (1405 - 1418)
 Sister-in-law – Grand Princess Consort Samhanguk of the Changnyeong Seong clan (삼한국 대부인 창녕 성씨, 三韓國 大夫人 昌寧 成氏)
 Adoptive nephew – Yi Yong, Grand Prince Anpyeong (안평대군 용) (18 October 1418 - 18 November 1453)
 Adoptive nephew – Yi Ui, Prince Woncheon (원천군 이의) (1433 - March 1476)
 Unnamed younger brother (? - ?)
 Unnamed younger brother (? - ?)
 Unnamed younger brother (? - ?)
 Unnamed younger brother (1412 - 1412)
Consorts and their respective issue:
 Grand Princess Consort Yeseong of the Haeju Jeong clan (예성부부인 해주 정씨) (1394 - 1470)
 Yi Chae, Prince Uiseong (이채 의성군) (1411 - 1493)
 Yi Chin, Prince Seowon (이친 서원군) (1413 - 1475)
 Yi Gap, Prince Boseong (이갑 보성군) (1416 - 1466)
 Yi Mil, Prince Nakan (이밀 낙안군) (1417 - 1474)
 Yi Jeong, Prince Yeongcheon (이정 영천군) (1422 - ?)
 Yi Ui, Prince Woncheon (이의 원천군) (1423 - 1476)
 Princess Biin (비인 현주) (12 June 1427 - 24 December 1514)
 Lady Son of the Pyeonghae Son clan (평해 손씨)
 Yi Nang (이낭) (1430 - ?)
 Princess Yi of the Jeonju Yi clan (현주 이씨)
 Princess Yi of the Jeonju Yi clan (현주 이씨)

References 

The information in this article is based on that in its Korean equivalent.

1396 births
1486 deaths
Korean princes
House of Yi
Joseon dynasty
History of Buddhism in Korea